Myth & Roid (stylized in all caps) is a Japanese pop rock band centered around  (guitars, bass, composer, production) and hotaru (keyboards, lyrics, story planning), featuring multiple vocalists. The band made its debut in 2015 with the release of its first single "L.L.L". The band's music has been featured in various anime series such as Overlord, Boogiepop wa Warawanai (2019), BBK/BRNK, Saga of Tanya the Evil, Cautious Hero: The Hero Is Overpowered but Overly Cautious, Made in Abyss, Isekai Cheat Magician and Re:Zero − Starting Life in Another World.

History 
According to the band's official website, its name comes from two words: "myth" representing the past, and "android" representing the future; the band hopes that these two aspects will allow the creation of "a new world".

The band debuted with Mayu Maeshima on vocals in 2015, with the release of its first single "L.L.L" (Leashed Luminous Love); the ending theme to the 2015 anime television series Overlord. The single peaked at No. 29 on the Oricon weekly charts, and reached a ranking of No. 3 on iTunes' Japanese download rankings.

The band's second single "ANGER/ANGER" was released on February 24, 2016; the title track is used as the ending theme to the 2016 anime television series BBK/BRNK. The single peaked at No. 82 on the Oricon weekly charts. The band's third single "STYX HELIX" was released on May 25, 2016; the title song is used as the first ending theme to the 2016 anime television series Re:Zero − Starting Life in Another World, and the coupling song "STRAIGHT BET" is used as the ending theme for episode 7. The band's fourth single "Paradisus-Paradoxum" was released on August 24, 2016; the title track is used as the second opening theme to Re:Zero -Starting Life in Another World-, and the coupling song "theater D" is used as the ending theme for episode 14. The unit's fifth single "Jingo Jungle" was released on February 8, 2017; the single's title track is used as the opening theme to the 2017 anime television series The Saga of Tanya the Evil. The band also performed theme songs for two Overlord theatrical movie released in 2017.

In 2017, KIHOW joined the band after being discovered by Tom-H@ck. Having lived overseas in the past, she is capable of singing in both English and Japanese. Able to freely transform her singing style, her voice is known as the "rainbow-colored voice".

On April 24, 2017, the band's first album eYe's was released.

In November 2017, it was announced that vocalist Mayu Maeshima would be "graduating" from the band in order to pursue a solo career.

On December 18, 2017, the band's sixth single "HYDRA" was announced, and KIHOW's face was revealed as part of the cover for the album

The band debuted KIHOW on lead vocals in 2018, with the release of "HYDRA", the title track is used as the ending to the 2018 anime television series Overlord II.

Later in 2018 the band's seventh single "VORACITY" was the opening for Overlord III.

In 2019, the band's song "shadowgraph" was used as the opening theme for the anime Boogiepop and Others. Its coupling track, "Remembrance", was featured in the first theatrical movie release of "The Saga of Tanya the Evil". The band's song "PANTA RHEI" was used as the opening theme for the anime Isekai Cheat Magician while their song "TIT FOR TAT" was used as the opening theme for the anime Cautious Hero: The Hero Is Overpowered but Overly Cautious.

In December 2019, it was announced that the band's best album MUSEUM–THE BEST OF MYTH & ROID– would be released on March 4, 2020. The song "FOREVER LOST" was included as new song and used as the ending theme to the film Made in Abyss: Dawn of the Deep Soul while "Cracked Black" was also included in the album and used as Overlord mobile game "MASS FOR THE DEAD" first anniversary theme song.

In October 2020, it was announced that their 2 songs "Future is Mine" and "Reminiscence Reincarnation", respectively used as "Shin Kaku Gi Kou and The Eleven Destroyers" and "Eternal City" mobile games theme songs, would be finally released on their first digital album Future Is Mine under their independent label "TaWaRa CREATIVE" where both Tom-H@ck and hotaru work. The album was released on October 28, 2020. This was their first digital worldwide release. 

In March 2021, they announced a collaboration song with Honkai Impact 3rd to celebrate the 3rd anniversary of the global version. The preview of the new song "BRILLIANT BRIGHT" was shown on the anniversary special video by miHoYo, uploaded on Honkai Impact 3rd official YouTube Channel, featuring various female characters from the game with a bunny dress. The full song was pre-released on March 31, 2021, on the official full MV by miHoYo.

"BRILLIANT BRIGHT" was released worldwide on April 7, 2021, on streaming platforms.

In May 2021, KIHOW announced that she was in charge of the theme songs of a new Japanese Theatrical Drama called "Boiled, Shrimp & Crab". The opening and ending songs were released as a digital single, produced by MOS, under TaWaRa CREATIVE.

In July 2021, KIHOW participated in an album called "Wacompi" as guest vocalist, released by Grater Records. The album is a compilation of songs by virtual and real artists. She performed "Narcosis".

In August 2021, KIHOW collaborated with Touhou LostWord mobile game. She was featured in a vocalized version of one of the most popular OST from the game "U.N Owen Was Her?" called "I'm Alright!"

In October 2021, KIHOW announced that she will debut as a solo singer with a new artist photo, though she will remain as MYTH & ROID vocalist.
On November 8, 2021, her first digital single glitter was released.

In November 2021, KIHOW and Mili's vocalist Cassie announced a collaboration song, produced by Mili, for Limbus Company by Project Moon. On December 21, 2021 "In Hell We Live, Lament" by Mili feat. KIHOW was released worldwide on streaming platforms as a digital single.

In January 2022, KIHOW announced a collaboration song with Touhou Danmaku Kagura called "Don't Unravel*". She was a secret guest of the live stream for the half year anniversary of the game. She also performed the song. It was included in the game on February 4.

In March 2022, KIHOW announced a collaboration song with Artiswitch for its MV series. "Paint" was released as her 2nd digital single on April 15.

In May 2022, during the live-streamed Golden Week special for Made in Abyss: Retsujitsu no Ōgonkyō (Made in Abyss: The Golden City of the Scorching Sun), the second season of the anime series, it was announced that the band will perform the ED song "Endless Embrance". The song was released as their eleventh single on August 24, 2022.

Discography

Albums

Studio albums

Compilation albums

Digital albums

Singles

Digital singles

References

External links 
 

Japanese musical groups
Musical groups established in 2015
Media Factory
Anime musical groups
Japanese rock music groups
2015 establishments in Japan